The V8 Supercars Privateers Cup was a competition for non professional racing teams competing in the V8 Supercar and Australian Touring Car Championship series. This was created so the Australian Racing Drivers Club's AMSCAR series would not impact on competitors in the main series. With number increasing, this competition was abandoned in 2000 and the new Konica V8 Lites Series was formed to make a second tier. As more professional teams entered this competition, in 2008, another series called the V8 Touring Car National Series was formed to make a third tier competition.

Cup winners

See also
 Super2 Series
 1997 ARDC AMSCAR series
 V8 Touring Car National Series

References

External links
 Autosport Forum

Australian Touring Car Championship